Tower Square (formerly known as BellSouth Center, Southern Bell Center, and AT&T Midtown Center I) is a , 47-story skyscraper located in Midtown Atlanta, Georgia. Completed in 1982, it serves as the regional headquarters of BellSouth Telecommunications, which does business as AT&T Southeast, and was acquired as part of AT&T's acquisition of BellSouth. BellSouth Corporate headquarters was located in the Campanile building, also in Midtown. By 2020, AT&T had vacated its offices.

Background
The company, then called Southern Bell, originally planned to build the parking deck for the tower one block further east at the corner of Ponce de Leon Avenue and Peachtree Street. This would have required the razing of the historic Fox Theatre which would have been an especially great loss to the city after the downtown Loew's Grand Theatre was destroyed by fire in 1978. Tremendous opposition, protests, fundraising, and petition drives within the community prevented the Fox's demolition. Even Liberace spoke out on behalf of the "Fabulous Fox". In the end, a complicated deal was struck to build the parking deck on an alternate site north of the main tower on West Peachtree Street.

The building has a direct entrance to the North Avenue MARTA Station, which is located at the southern end of the complex and was built concurrently with the building. In 2002, BellSouth completed construction of two additional mid-rise buildings adjacent to the tower to form its BellSouth Midtown Center campus as part of its effort to consolidate office space around mass transit stations.

The architects who designed the tower were Skidmore, Owings & Merrill and Rosser International, Inc. The general contractor for its construction was Beers Skanska, Inc. The building also served as a filming location for the 1993 science fiction action film RoboCop 3, in which it was used as the setting for the headquarters of the evil megacorporation O.C.P, the main antagonist organization in the RoboCop trilogy.

In 2019, a major renovation and re-branding to "Tower Square" was announced. It was subsequently renamed in October 2020.

See also
Architecture of Atlanta
List of tallest buildings in Atlanta

References

External links

 

 Tower Square at LoopNet

Midtown Center
Midtown Atlanta
Skyscraper office buildings in Atlanta
Telecommunications company headquarters in the United States
Skidmore, Owings & Merrill buildings
Cecil Alexander buildings
1982 establishments in Georgia (U.S. state)
Office buildings completed in 1982